Ralf Schneider (born 25 August 1986) is a German former professional footballer who played as a left midfielder.

References

External links

1986 births
Living people
German footballers
Association football midfielders
2. Bundesliga players
Regionalliga players
Eintracht Frankfurt II players
FSV Frankfurt players
Rot-Weiß Oberhausen players
SC Hessen Dreieich players
Hammer SpVg players
Sportspeople from Darmstadt
21st-century German people